The Baroda cricket team is a domestic cricket team based in the city of Vadodara, Gujarat. The home ground of the team is the Moti Bagh Stadium on the palace grounds.

The team is run by the Baroda Cricket Association. It has been one of the most successful teams in the Ranji Trophy in the new millennium.

Baroda were runners-up in the 2005/06 Ranji Trophy. It is one of three Gujarat Teams, the others being the Saurashtra cricket team and Gujarat cricket team.

Competition history

Baroda has only emerged as a strong team in recent years. It won its first Ranji Trophy in 43 years in 2000–01, but failed to defend the title, coming runner-up in the next year. This means it has had only one Irani Trophy appearance, in which it failed to defeat a strong Rest of India team which contained the likes of VVS Laxman (13 & 148), Dinesh Mongia (125 & 90*), Debashish Mohanty, Sarandeep Singh and Akash Chopra. See Scorecard. It was considered a strong team in the 1940s and 1950s, winning 4 times and coming runner-up twice.
Vijay Hazare , Irfan Pathan , Yusuf Pathan , Hardik Pandya are amongst the most prominent cricketers to emerge from Baroda. They have performed exceedingly well at the international level for India.

Best performances in Ranji Trophy

Home grounds

 Moti Bagh Stadium, Vadodara – Hosted three ODIs. Capacity 18,000.
 Reliance Stadium, Vadodara – hosted 10 ODIs
 Gujarat State Fertilizer Corporation Ground

Current squad

Players with international caps are listed in bold.

Updated as on 24 January 2023

Coaching staff

 Head coach – Jacob Martin
 Assistant coach – Himanshu Jadhav
 Physio – Sumit Roy
 Trainers – Rakesh Gohil

Famous players

Hemu Adhikari
Amir Elahi
Gul Mohammad
Anshuman Gaekwad
Datta Gaekwad
Jayasinghrao Ghorpade
Vijay Hazare
Nayan Mongia
Rashid Patel
Kiran More
C. S. Nayudu
Yusuf Pathan
Irfan Pathan
Munaf Patel 
Zaheer Khan
Hardik Pandya 
Krunal Pandya
Ambati Rayudu   
Pinal Shah      
Jaykishan Kolsawala

Pinal Shah

References

External links
  Baroda Cricket Association (BCA) – Official Website 
 Baroda Cricket Team at CricBuzz
 Cricinfo's Complete History of the Indian Domestic Competitions

Indian first-class cricket teams
Sport in Vadodara
Cricket in Gujarat
1886 establishments in India
Cricket clubs established in 1886